KZLF-LP (98.5 FM) was a radio station broadcasting a religious radio format. Licensed to Pullman, Washington, United States, the station served the Pullman-Moscow area.  The station was owned by The Church in Pullman.

KZLF-LP's license was cancelled by the Federal Communications Commission, due to the station's failure to file a license renewal application.

References

External links
 

Defunct radio stations in the United States
ZLF-LP
ZLF-LP
Radio stations established in 2006
Pullman, Washington
Defunct religious radio stations in the United States
Radio stations disestablished in 2014
2006 establishments in Washington (state)
2014 disestablishments in Washington (state)
ZLF-LP